Krista Pärmäkoski (née Lähteenmäki; born 12 December 1990) is a Finnish cross-country skier who has been competing since 2007. Among other career achievements, she is a five-time Olympic medalist.

Career
At the 2010 Winter Olympics, Pärmäkoski finished 26th in the 30 km and 53rd in the 10 km event. At the FIS Nordic World Ski Championships 2009 in Liberec, she finished 37th in the 10 km event.

She won her first World Championship medals in Oslo 2011, a silver in the team sprint and a bronze in 4 × 5 km relay. Since then, she has amassed four other bronze medals in these events, the latest being a relay bronze in the 2021 championships in Oberstdorf.

At the 2014 Winter Olympics in Sochi, Pärmäkoski placed 10th in the 10 km classical event and won her first Olympic medal when she anchored Finland into second place in the 4 x 5 km relay.

The 2017 World Championships on home soil in Lahti, Finland, saw Pärmäkoski win her first and to date only individual WCH medal, a silver in the 15 km skiathlon behind Marit Bjørgen. The 2016–17 season was also Pärmäkoski's big breakthrough in the World Cup; she reached the podium ten times, came in second at the Tour de Ski, and placed 2nd in the overall World Cup.

The 2018 Olympics in Pyeongchang were also a remarkable success for Pärmäkoski, who won a medal in all three individual distance competitions. She won bronze both in the 15 km skiathlon and 10 km freestyle, the latter she shared with Bjørgen as their finishing times were the same. Pärmäkoski closed off the Olympics with a silver medal in the 30 km classical. Her good form from the Olympics continued for the rest of the season; among other podiums, she won the 10 km classical competitions in Lahti and Falun.

Pärmäkoski came close to another individual medal when she finished 4th in the 10 km classical in the 2019 World Championships in Seefeld, missing out on the bronze medal by only two seconds. She won her next medal at the next Olympics in Beijing in 2022, where she seized a bronze in 10 km classical after Therese Johaug and Finnish teammate Kerttu Niskanen, with only 0.1 seconds separating her from Natalia Nepryaeva of the ROC who came in fourth. As the anchor for Finland in both the team sprint and relay, Pärmäkoski finished 4th, with bare seconds from medal placements. Pärmäkoski was Finland's flag bearer in the closing ceremony.

During her career, Pärmäkoski has amassed five wins and 32 World Cup podiums overall. She has enjoyed much success at the Tour de Ski, finishing 2nd and 3rd once alongside four 4th places. In terms of individual and team Olympic and World Championship medals and World Cup success, she is one of the most successful Finnish cross-country skiers of the 21st century.

Personal life 
In August 2014 she married Tommi Pärmäkoski.

Cross-country skiing results
All results are sourced from the International Ski Federation (FIS).

Olympic Games
 5 medals – (2 silver, 3 bronze)

World Championships
7 medals – (2 silver, 5 bronze)

World Cup

Season standings

Individual podiums
 5 victories – (2 , 3 ) 
 36 podiums – (17 , 19 )

Team podiums
 10 podiums – (10 )

References

External links

1990 births
Living people
People from Ikaalinen
Cross-country skiers at the 2010 Winter Olympics
Cross-country skiers at the 2014 Winter Olympics
Cross-country skiers at the 2018 Winter Olympics
Cross-country skiers at the 2022 Winter Olympics
Finnish female cross-country skiers
Olympic cross-country skiers of Finland
FIS Nordic World Ski Championships medalists in cross-country skiing
Tour de Ski skiers
Medalists at the 2014 Winter Olympics
Medalists at the 2018 Winter Olympics
Medalists at the 2022 Winter Olympics
Olympic medalists in cross-country skiing
Olympic silver medalists for Finland
Olympic bronze medalists for Finland
Sportspeople from Pirkanmaa
21st-century Finnish women